Lisa J. Mirabello is an American medical geneticist who researches genetic susceptibility to pediatric cancer and the genomics of HPV carcinogenicity. She is a senior investigator in the clinical genetics branch at the National Cancer Institute.

Life 
Lisa Mirabello earned her Ph.D. in biomedical sciences with a focus on molecular population genetics and infectious disease from the University at Albany, SUNY School of Public Health in 2007. Her dissertation was titled, Molecular population genetics of the malaria vector Anopheles darlingi throughout Central and South America using mitochondrial, nuclear, and microsatellite markers. Her dissertation committee members included Jan Conn, Laura D. Kramer, Robert L. Glaser, Gregory Ebel, and Jason Cryan. Mirabello joined the clinical genetics branch of the National Cancer Institute's (NCI) division of cancer epidemiology and genetics (DCEG) as a postdoctoral Cancer Genetics research fellow in 2007. 

Mirabello was promoted to research fellow in 2010 and she was appointed as an Earl Stadtman Investigator in 2013. She was awarded National Institutes of Health (NIH) scientific tenure and promoted to senior investigator in 2019. Mirabello's research program is focused on genetic susceptibility to pediatric cancer and the genomics of HPV carcinogenicity.

See also 

 List of University at Albany people

References 

Living people
Year of birth missing (living people)
Place of birth missing (living people)
University at Albany, SUNY alumni
National Institutes of Health people
21st-century American women scientists
American women geneticists
American geneticists
Medical geneticists
21st-century American biologists
American medical researchers
Women medical researchers
Cancer researchers